Rolfidium is a genus of lichenized fungi in the family Ramalinaceae.

The genus was circumscribed by Jan Roland Moberg in Lichenologist vol.18 (4) on page 305 in 1986.

The genus name of Rolfidium is in honour of Rolf Santesson (1916–2013), who was a Swedish lichenologist and university lecturer.

Species
As accepted by Species Fungorum;
 Rolfidium bumammum 
 Rolfidium nigropallidum 
 Rolfidium peltatum

References

External links 

Ramalinaceae
Lichen genera
Lecanorales genera